Weems may refer to:

People:
Capell Lane Weems (1860-1913), Republican Congressman from Ohio
Carrie Mae Weems (born 1953), American photographer
Debbie Weems (1951-1978), American actress
Donald Weems, birth name of Kuwasi Balagoon (1946-1986), American Black Panther, member of the Black Liberation Army, and New Afrikan anarchist
Eric Weems (born 1985), American National Football League player
John Crompton Weems (1778-1862), American politician
Jordan Weems (born 1992), American baseball player
Katherine Lane Weems (1899-1989), American sculptor
Kimberly Weems, American statistician
Mason Locke Weems, generally known as Parson Weems (1759-1825), American book agent and author
P. V. H. Weems (1889-?), inventor of air navigation and related instruments
Priscilla Weems (born 1972), American actress
Sonny Weems (born 1986), American National Basketball Association player; now player for Maccabi Tel Aviv of the Israeli Premier League and the Euroleague
Ted Weems (1901-1963), American bandleader and musician

Places:
Mount Weems, Antarctica, named for P. V. H. Weems
Weems, Ohio, an unincorporated community
Weems, Virginia, an unincorporated community

Fictional characters:
Duquan "Dukie" Weems, in the television drama The Wire
Corporal Wallace A. Weems, codenamed Rip Cord (G.I. Joe)
Stephen Weems, also known as Modular Man, a Marvel Comics villain
"Ace" Weems, in the television comedy Get Smart episode The Mess of Adrian Listenger
Other uses:
a dugout, called a Weems in ancient Scotland
Weems House, a historic residence in Mobile, Alabama

See also
Wemyss (disambiguation)